Rubin Williams (born July 9, 1983) is an American former athlete.

Williams grew up in San Jose, California and is a graduate of Valley Christian School. He attended the University of Tennessee and broke the school's 200 meters record, which had been held by Justin Gatlin. At the 2002 World Junior Championships in Kingston, Williams finished fourth in the final of the 200 metres, won by Usain Bolt. In 2007 he was a bronze medalist in the 200 meters at the Pan American Games in Rio de Janeiro. He was 200 meters champion at the 2008 NCAA Indoor Track and Field Championships and came third in the 60 meters at the 2011 USA Indoor Track and Field Championships.

References

External links
Rubin Williams at World Athletics

1983 births
Living people
American male sprinters
Pan American Games bronze medalists for the United States
Pan American Games medalists in athletics (track and field)
Medalists at the 2007 Pan American Games
Medalists at the 2011 Pan American Games
Athletes (track and field) at the 2007 Pan American Games
Athletes (track and field) at the 2011 Pan American Games
Track and field athletes from San Jose, California
Tennessee Volunteers men's track and field athletes
21st-century American people